Polytechnic High School, also known colloquially as "Poly", is a public high school located in Fort Worth, Texas, United States.

History 
The Polytechnic Heights community originally grew around the Manchester Cotton Mill and merged with the city of Fort Worth in 1922. The first school associated with the Manchester community was formed in 1886 and replaced by a  new, expanded Polytechnic Heights School in 1907. The class of 1912, Polytechnic's first graduating class, had just eleven students. In 1923, now part of the Fort Worth Public Schools, Polytechnic moved to an even larger building at 1202 Nashville Street and the old building became an elementary school. In 1938, Poly moved two blocks away to its current building, which was designed by renowned local architect, Joseph Pelich.

Notable alumni
 Kenneth Copeland (b. 1936), televangelist, author, and head of Kenneth Copeland Ministries 
 Thomas Herrion (1981-2005), former American football player
 Hugh Parmer (1939-2020), former mayor of Fort Worth and former member of both houses of the Texas State Legislature
 Johnny Vaught (1909–2006), college football coach at the University of Mississippi (Ole Miss). 1947-1970 and 1973; inducted into the College Football Hall of Fame in 1979; in 1982, Ole Miss renamed its football stadium from Hemingway Stadium to Vaught–Hemingway Stadium in his honor

References

Public high schools in Fort Worth, Texas
Fort Worth Independent School District high schools